Menesia flavotecta is a species of beetle in the family Cerambycidae. It was described by Heyden in 1886. It is known from Japan, Russia, China, and possibly Mongolia.

References

Menesia
Beetles described in 1886